The Beau-Rivage Palace is a historical luxury five-star hotel in Lausanne, Switzerland. It is located in Ouchy, on the shores of Lake Léman.

The hotel opened in 1861 and the current main building was constructed in Art Nouveau and neo-baroque style in 1908. It is registered in the Swiss Inventory of Cultural Property of National and Regional Significance.

The Beau-Rivage Palace is owned by Sandoz Family Foundation founders of Sandoz AG, now Novartis.

Events 

On 24 July 1923, the Treaty of Lausanne was signed at the Beau-Rivage Palace.

In March–April 2015, the negotiations on Iran nuclear deal framework for a comprehensive agreement on the Iranian nuclear programme took place in the Beau-Rivage Palace, where the foreign ministers and delegations from the United States, the United Kingdom, Russia, China, France, the European Union, Germany (P5+1) and Iran were also hosted. The final press conference, on 2 April 2015, was held at the EPFL Learning Centre.

See also 
 List of cultural property of national significance in Switzerland: Vaud
 Lausanne Palace

References

Hotels in Switzerland
Buildings and structures in Lausanne
Hotel buildings completed in 1869
Hotel buildings completed in 1908
Hotels established in 1861
Art Deco architecture
Tourist attractions in Lausanne
1861 establishments in Switzerland
19th-century architecture in Switzerland
20th-century architecture in Switzerland